Gary Fred Merrill (August 2, 1915 – March 5, 1990) was an American film and television actor whose credits included more than 50 feature films, a half-dozen mostly short-lived TV series, and dozens of television guest appearances. He starred in All About Eve and married his costar Bette Davis.

Early life
Merrill was born in Hartford, Connecticut, and attended Bowdoin College in Brunswick, Maine, and Trinity College in Hartford.  He began acting in 1944, while still in the United States Army Air Forces, in the play Winged Victory.

Career
Before entering films, Merrill's deep cultured voice won him a recurring role as Batman in the Superman radio series. His film career began promisingly, with roles in films such as Twelve O'Clock High (1949) and All About Eve (1950), but he rarely moved beyond supporting roles in his many Westerns, war movies, and medical dramas. His television career was extensive. He appeared from 1954 to 1956 as Jason Tyler on the crime drama Justice.

In 1958, Merrill guest starred with June Lockhart in the roles of Joshua and Emily Newton in the episode "Medicine Man" of the series Cimarron City.

Merrill had recurring roles in Then Came Bronson with Michael Parks and Young Doctor Kildare, both of which lasted less than a season.

In addition to Merrill's starring roles in several episodes of Alfred Hitchcock Presents, in November 1963 he starred with Phyllis Thaxter and Fess Parker (Daniel Boone) in an episode of The Alfred Hitchcock Hour ("Nothing Ever Happens in Linvale").

In 1964, he starred as city editor Lou Sheldon in the short-lived drama The Reporter.

In 1967, he starred in the Elvis Presley film Clambake, with costar James Gregory.

Aside from an occasional role as narrator, Merrill essentially retired from the entertainment business after 1980. Shortly before his death, he authored the autobiography Bette, Rita and the Rest of My Life (1989).

Personal life

Merrill's first marriage, to Barbara Leeds in 1941, ended in divorce in Mexico on July 28, 1950. That same day, he married Bette Davis, his costar from All About Eve, and adopted her daughter, Barbara, from a previous marriage. They adopted two more children, Margot and Michael, but they had a bitter divorce in 1960.

Often politically active, he campaigned in 1958 to elect the Democrat Edmund Muskie as governor of Maine. He also took part in the Selma to Montgomery marches in 1965 to promote Black voter registration. In response to U.S. President Lyndon B. Johnson's Vietnam War policy, he unsuccessfully sought nomination to the Maine legislature as an anti-war, pro-environmentalist primary candidate.

Merrill survived his second  ex-wife, Bette Davis, by only five months, dying of lung cancer in Falmouth, Maine, on March 5, 1990. He is buried in the Pine Grove Cemetery. He was survived by a son, Michael; a daughter, Margot; a brother, Jerry; and two grandchildren.

Filmography

This Is the Army (1943) - Backstage MP on Right (uncredited)
Winged Victory (1944) - Capt. McIntyre 
Slattery's Hurricane (1949) - Cmdr. E.T. Kramer
Twelve O'Clock High (1949) - Col. Keith Davenport
Mother Didn't Tell Me (1950) - Doctor Peter Roberts
Where the Sidewalk Ends (1950) - Tommy Scalise
All About Eve (1950) - Bill Sampson (A typographical error in the film's credits lists the character's name as "Simpson.)
Rawhide (1951) - Narrator (voice, uncredited)
The Frogmen (1951) - Lt. Cmdr. Pete Vincent
Another Man's Poison (1951) - George Bates
Decision Before Dawn (1951) - Col. Devlin
Phone Call from a Stranger (1952) - David Trask
The Girl in White (1952) - Dr. Seth Pawling
Night Without Sleep (1952) - Richard Morton
A Blueprint for Murder (1953) - Fred Sargent
Witness to Murder (1954) - Lawrence Mathews
The Black Dakotas (1954) - Brock Marsh posing as Zachary Paige
The Human Jungle (1954) - Police Capt. John Danforth
Navy Wife (1956) - Jack Blain
Bermuda Affair (1956) - Bob Scoffield
The Missouri Traveler (1958) - Doyle Magee
Crash Landing (1958) - Capt. Steve Williams
The Wonderful Country (1959) - Maj. Stark Colton
The Savage Eye (1960) - The poet
The Great Impostor (1961) - Pa Demara
The Pleasure of His Company (1961) - James Dougherty
Mysterious Island (1961) - Gideon Spilitt
A Girl Named Tamiko (1962) - Max Wilson
Hong Kong un Addio (Farewell to Hong Kong, 1963)
The Searching Eye (1964) - Narrator
Catacombs (1965) - Raymond Garth
Ride Beyond Vengeance (1966) - Dub Stokes
Cast a Giant Shadow (1966) - Pentagon Chief of Staff (scenes deleted)
Destination Inner Space (1966) - Dr. LaSatier
Around the World Under the Sea (1966) - Dr. August 'Gus' Boren
The Last Challenge (1967) - Squint Calloway
Clambake (1967) - Sam
The Incident (1967) - Douglas McCann
The Power (1968) - Mark Corlane
Più tardi, Claire, più tardi (1968) - George Dennison
Amarsi male (1969)
The Secret of the Sacred Forest (1970) - Mike Parks
Earth II (1971) - Walter Dietrich
Huckleberry Finn (1974) - Pap
Thieves (1977) - Street Man
The Seekers (1979) - Capt. Hull
September Song (1984)

Television
Merrill's television work spanned from 1953 to 1980. Most of his appearances were in guest-star roles in episodic and anthology series. Among the programs he appeared in were: 

The 20th Century-Fox Hour
Wagon Train
Studio 57
Studio One
Playhouse 90, Alcoa Theatre
Rawhide
Laramie
Cimarron City
Sam Benedict
Alfred Hitchcock Presents (numerous episodes, including "Man With A Problem" 1957 and "O Youth and Beauty" 1960)
Zane Grey Theater
The Twilight Zone (episode "Still Valley" as Confederate soldier Joseph Paradine)
General Electric Theater
Ben Casey
Checkmate
Combat!
The Outer Limits
Bob Hope Presents the Chrysler Theatre
Voyage to the Bottom of the Sea
The Time Tunnel
Marcus Welby, M.D.
Medical Center
Kung Fu
Cannon
Movin' On.
The American Adventure (narrator, 1972–73)
The Valiant Years
Branded 1965 Romany Round up Part 1 & 2

Radio appearances

References

External links

1915 births
1990 deaths
Male actors from Maine
American male film actors
American male radio actors
American male television actors
Bowdoin College alumni
Deaths from cancer in Maine
Deaths from lung cancer
Maine Democrats
People from Falmouth, Maine
Male actors from Hartford, Connecticut
20th Century Studios contract players
20th-century American male actors
United States Army Air Forces personnel of World War II
Activists for African-American civil rights